The 2018 African Men's Youth Handball Championship was held in Marrakesh, Morocco from 15 to 22 September 2018 at the Prince Moulay Rachid Hall. The top three teams qualified for the 2019 Men's Youth World Handball Championship.

Results
All times are local (UTC+1).

References

Men's Youth Handball Championship
African Men's Youth Handball Championship
African Men's Youth Handball Championship
African Men's Youth Handball Championship
Youth
African Men's Youth Handball Championship